Shotor Khoft is a village in Khaveh-ye Shomali Rural District, in the Central District of Delfan County, Lorestan Province, Iran. At the 2006 census, its population was 703, in 162 families.

References 

Towns and villages in Delfan County